Happy Hollow Park & Zoo is a small  zoo and amusement park in San Jose, California, which originally opened in 1961. It was closed in 2008 for major renovations, and opened its gates again on March 20, 2010.

Happy Hollow Park & Zoo is an accredited member of the Association of Zoos and Aquariums (AZA) and a member of the International Association of Amusement Parks and Attractions (IAAPA).

History
Jaycees members Alden Campen and Ernie Renzel started planning the park in 1956. They bought the original  at the north end of today's Kelley Park for $300,000 on the city's behalf.

Features
 Puppet theater
 Animal hospital with indoor and outdoor quarantine, surgery and radiology
 Education center built out of hay bales with year-round classes for ages 12-months to adult
 Rides and structures for toddlers and children featuring slides, swings, ropes and climbing areas
 Carousel and roller coaster

Exhibits

 Petting zoo with an animal barn
 "Parallel play area" for children: next to endangered lemurs
 Fossa exhibit (a member of the mongoose family, most famous for its role in the movie Madagascar)
 The museum is open everyday from 10:00 a.m. to 5:00 p.m.

Animal list

Animals on exhibit 

Black and White Ruffed Lemur
Capybara
Collared Peccary
Dwarf Zebu
Fennec Fox
Fossa
Giant Anteaters
Guinea Pigs
Jaguar
Meerkats
Navajo Churro Sheep
Parma Wallaby
Pygmy Goat
Red Panda
Red Ruffed Lemur
Ring Tailed Lemur
Squirrel Monkey
African Spurred Tortoise
American Alligator
Red-Eared Slider Turtle
Corn Snake
Black-necked Stilt
Blue and Gold Macaw
Cattle Egret
Crested Wood Partridge
Eclectus Parrots
Speckled Pigeon
Turkey Vulture
Ringed Teal Duck
White Faced Whistling Duck

Animals that are part of their Education Program 

 Domestic Ferret
 Four-Toed Hedgehog
 Prehensile-tailed Porcupine
 Domestic Rabbit
 Striped Skunk
 Barbary Dove
 Eclectus Parrot
 Great Horned Owl
 Ball Python
 Box turtle
 Desert tortoise
 Indonesian Blue Tongued skink
 Leopard gecko
 Prehensile-tailed Skink
 Kenyan Sand Boa
 Hybrid Tiger Salamander
 Giant Forest Scorpion
 Red-Kneed Tarantula
 Giant African Millipede
 Madagascar Hissing Cockroach

Rides

Part of the Giggle Grove Area 

 Dragon Flyer
 Kiddie Swings
 Frog Hopper
 The Granny Bugs
 The Mini Putts

Other Rides 

 Keep-Around-Carousel
 Pacific Fruit Express Family Roller Coaster
 Danny the Dragon Ride

References

Gallery

External links

Parks in San Jose, California
Animal theme parks
Zoos in California
San Francisco Bay Area amusement parks
Tourist attractions in San Jose, California
Zoos established in 1961